The men's tournament of the water polo at the 2022 South American Games was held from 11 to 15 October 2022 at the Centro Acuático Nacional in Asunción, Paraguay. It was the third appearance of the water polo men's tournament since the first edition in Medellín 2010.

The tournament served as qualifier for the 2023 Pan American Games, with the top two teams qualifying to the men's water polo tournament.

Brazil won the gold medal and their first South American Games men's water polo title after beating the defending champions Argentina 13–12 (3–2 on penalties) in the final. Both teams, Brazil and Argentina, qualified for the 2023 Pan American Games as the CONSANAT representatives, besides Chile who qualified automatically as hosts.

Colombia beat Chile 18–6 to win the bronze medal.

Schedule
The tournament was held over a 5-day period, from 11 to 15 October.

Teams
A total of six ODESUR NOCs entered teams for the men's tournament. Originally, the tournament was going to be contested by seven teams including Peru, however, the Peruvian team decided to withdraw due to logistical reasons.

Rosters

Each participating NOC had to enter a roster of 13 players, including at least 2 goalkeepers (Technical manual Article 10.2).

Results
All match times are in PYST (UTC−3).

Preliminary round
The preliminary round consisted of a single group of 6 teams in which each team played once against the other 5 teams in the group on a round-robin format. The top four teams advanced to the semi-finals and the two bottom teams played for the fifth place.

Knockout stage
The knockout stage consisted of the fifth place match (between the fifth and sixth placed teams of the preliminary stage), the semi-finals and the bronze and gold medal matches. The semi-finals match-ups were:

Semifinal 1: Preliminary stage 1st placed team v Preliminary stage 4th placed team
Semifinal 2: Preliminary stage 2nd placed team v Preliminary stage 3rd placed team

Winners of semi-finals played the gold medal match, while losers played the bronze medal match.

Semi-finals

Fifth place match

Bronze medal match

Gold medal match

Final ranking

Medalists

Qualified teams for Pan American Games
The following three teams from CONSANAT qualified for the 2023 Pan American Games men's water polo tournament, including Chile which qualified as hosts.

1 Bold indicates champions for that year. Italic indicates hosts for that year.

References

External links
 ASU2022 Water polo Teams Male at ASU2022 official website.

Water polo at the 2022 South American Games